Sar Sureh may refer to:
 Sar Sureh, Kohgiluyeh and Boyer-Ahmad
 Sar Sureh, Sistan and Baluchestan